Pritam Singh Sandhu (21 December 1931 – 19 March 1999) was a Kenyan field hockey player. He competed at the 1960 Summer Olympics.

References

External links
 

1931 births
1999 deaths
Kenyan male field hockey players
Olympic field hockey players of Kenya
Field hockey players at the 1960 Summer Olympics
People from Mwanza Region
Sportspeople from Nairobi
Kenyan people of Indian descent
Kenyan people of Punjabi descent